Harry D. "Jake" Weller was an American football, basketball, and baseball coach.  He was the head football coach at Franklin & Marshall College in Lancaster, Pennsylvania for one season, in 1918, and at Albright College from 1926 to 1927, compiling a career college football coaching record of 11–8–1.  Weller served two stints at the head basketball at Franklin & Marshall, in 1917–18  and from 1924 to 1926, amassing a record of 15–22.  He was also the head baseball coach there from 1926 to 1926, tallying a mark of 14–14.

Head coaching record

Football

References

Year of birth missing
Year of death missing
Franklin & Marshall Diplomats baseball coaches
Franklin & Marshall Diplomats football coaches
Franklin & Marshall Diplomats men's basketball coaches
Albright Lions football coaches